The Fiat A.25 was an Italian water-cooled aircraft engine from the 1920s. It produced 708 kW (950 hp) and was used by the Regia Aeronautica for fifteen years to power their Fiat BR.2 and BR.3 bombers.

Design and development
During the 1920s Fiat introduced several water-cooled aircraft engines, including the A.20, A.22, A24, A.25 and A.30.  They were all upright V-12s with 60° between the cylinder banks; capacities ranged between 18.7 L and 54.5 L (1,141-3,324 cu in) and power outputs between 320 kW and 745 kW (430-1,000 hp).

Producing 710 kW (950 hp) from 54.5 L (3,324 cu in), the A.25 was the largest and most powerful in the range. When Fiat were advised by the government to simplify their water-cooled product line, they focussed on the A.20, A.22 and A.30 models, so the A.25 was not further developed.  They concentrated their higher power development effort on radial engines instead.

Operational history

The only series produced types powered by the A.25 were the Fiat BR.2 and BR.3 single engine bombers.  These began operating with the Regia Aeronautica in 1925.  Some, used as trainers, were still in service in 1939.

Applications
Fiat BR.2
Fiat BR.3
Fiat BR.4

Specifications

See also

References

1920s aircraft piston engines
A.25